Balilihan, officially the Municipality of Balilihan, is a 4th class rural municipality in the province of Bohol, Philippines. According to the 2020 census, it has a population of 18,694 people.

The inland municipality has a land area of 127.27 km2 (49.14 sq. mi).

History 
The place is a panorama of verdant hills, rugged mountains and green fields. It is said to have been so named because of the grass "balili" which grew in abundance.

Before the beginning of the 19th century, Balilihan was a barrio of Baclayon and an old settlement. When the Dagohoy revolt was suppressed by the Spaniards, the authorities established a garrison in Datag (one of its barrios) to discourage and stamp out further uprisings on the part of the natives.

Later, due to the scarcity of water, the seat of government was transferred to its present site which is amply supplied with water from various springs. The elevated land also made a good viewing point to keep watch over all nearby towns. Thus the construction of a Spanish belfry similar to the watch towers of the shores atop the hill. This tower is made of adobe stones gathered from the rock deposits of Baclayon. It was erected in the year 1835. It was inaugurated in 1846 by the gobernadorcillo. The padre's plan met vigorous opposition from the people and through the able leadership of Capitan Bartolome Racho, they filed the protest before the Spanish Military Governor Linares who disapproved the proposal causing Friar Grayoa's ire who then plotted for the consequent punishment of the captain by dragging him with the friar's horse through the streets causing his death in jail. Fearing reprisals from the clergy, some of the people migrated to Surigao, Leyte and Misamis. Not long afterwards, Friar Grayoa was transferred to Siquijor. The Spanish era flourished with the construction of Spanish church at the foot of the Spanish watchtower where a large patio became the hall for social affairs and the friar's convent a school for the cartilla, with the municipio across. With the guidance of the local appointed leaders under the control of the Spanish friar, the town slowly progressed peacefully until the outbreak of the revolution in 1898.

On 12 November 1900, American soldiers were known to be coming from Antequera. All officials of the town led by Capitan Antonio Racho came out to meet the soldiers with a brass band, but when the Americans arrived, they gathered all the officials in the municipal hall building and placed them under guard, for the Americans had heard that the town officials had been supporting the insurgents. The supplications of spokesman Segundo Racho not to burn the town was of no avail and the sounds of the welcoming brass band turned into volleys of gunshots. The officials were ordered to move towards Sevilla while the civilians ran for safety to the outskirts of the town. The town was razed to the ground. The Americans burned the church, the convent, the municipal building, the school building for boys and girls as well as private houses. The only structure that was spared was the belfry on the top of the hill.

By 1904, there was a move to fuse Balilihan with Antequera in order to meet the requirements of a municipality under the American regime. The people objected to the plan, so the following year the Philippine Commission finally ruled in its Act. No. 350 abolishing the municipality of Catigbian and instead annexing it to Balilihan as one of its barrios.

During World War II, the town residents went into hiding in their mountain hideouts for fear of the Japanese. Balilihan was a haven of refugees from other places who lived a life of privation in the mountains. Many innocent civilians were either tortured or put into death by the enemies on mere suspicions of guerilla activities. Ex-mayor Patricio Ibarra was put up by the people as war time mayor to defend them from their enemies.

The Japanese atrocities gave rise to the organizations of the guerrillas into full combat force under the supreme command of Mayor Ismael Ingeniero. The people helped the guerilla movement by feeding the troops in the front lines as well as those in the headquarters in Behind the Clouds, in Maitum which was the famous concentration camp of the war. Enemy collaborators were tried here and those found guilty of high crimes were liquidated. Those with slight offenses were imprisoned for the duration of the war. Another concentration camp was at Hanopol where prisoners were kept.

In 1948, Balilihan suffered a great loss of territory when the biggest barrio, Catigbian, was given its town charter in spite of the strong representation against the move by town mayor Balbino Chatto and Gerardo Racho who personally went to Malacañang to see President Elpidio Quirino.

Geography

Barangays 
Balilihan has 31 barangays.

Climate

Demographics

Culture

Town Festival
The municipality of Balilihan holds its annual town fiesta (town proper) every July 16 in honor of Our Lady of Mount Carmel, Barrios around Hanopol area - (a parish composed of 10 barrios) celebrate their annual town fiesta every January 16 in honor of Santo Niño. Another event takes place every last week of the month of September to celebrate the creation of Balilihan as a separate municipality on September 29, 1828.

Education

Gallery

References

External links

 [ Philippine Standard Geographic Code]
Municipality of Balilihan
 
 
 Balilihan

Municipalities of Bohol